Diocese of Ascoli may refer to:

Roman Catholic Diocese of Ascoli Piceno
Roman Catholic Diocese of Cerignola-Ascoli Satriano